"Sail the Wildest Stretch" is the third single from Golden Rule by alternative rock band Powderfinger.

On 15 May 2010, "Sail the Wildest Stretch" was used as the credit song to the special Australian program featured on Channel 9 titled Homecoming, of Jessica Watson's successful attempt at becoming the youngest person to sail around the world. The song's lyrics and sounds fit Jessica Watson's profile, hard work, idolism, and compassion of herself and her 7 months of sailing throughout the world. The song was featured at the end of the program when showing flashbacks of her voyage and words spoken by reporters/family.

Track listing

Charts

References

Powderfinger songs
2010 songs
Universal Records singles
Songs written by Bernard Fanning
Songs written by Jon Coghill
Songs written by John Collins (Australian musician)
Songs written by Ian Haug
Songs written by Darren Middleton